Ten Days in the Valley is an American drama television series that aired on ABC from October 1, 2017, through January 6, 2018. The series, starring Kyra Sedgwick, was ordered direct-to-series on August 4, 2016. After airing four episodes, ABC announced that they were pulling the series from their schedule but would air the rest of the episodes beginning December 16, 2017.

Premise
A television producer's life gets complicated after her young daughter disappears in the middle of the night and the two worlds she tries to navigate violently collide.

Cast and characters

Main
 Kyra Sedgwick as Jane Sadler
 Adewale Akinnuoye-Agbaje as Detective John Bird
 Kick Gurry as Pete Greene
 Erika Christensen as Ali Petrovich
 Josh Randall as Tom Petrovich
 Felix Solis as Commander Elliot Gomez
 Francois Battiste as Gus Tremblay
 Malcolm-Jamal Warner as Matt Walker
 Abigail Pniowsky as Lake Sadler-Greene

Recurring
 Emily Kinney as Casey
 Ali Liebert as Detective Nickole Bilson
 Ella Thomas as Detective Isabel Knight
 Gage Golightly as Lynn
 Marisol Ramirez as Beatriz
 Carlos Sanz as Chistopher Gomez
 Currie Graham as Henry Vega

Episodes

Production
The series began development in early 2016 with Demi Moore set to star. She left the project for unknown reasons, and was replaced by Kyra Sedgwick.

Critical reception
The review aggregator website Rotten Tomatoes reported a 61% approval rating with an average rating of 7.45/10 based on 18 reviews. The website's consensus reads, "Ten Days in the Valleys instantly tense delivery of familiar material leads to an intriguing character study and engrossing mystery despite naggingly untapped potential." Metacritic, which uses a weighted average, assigned a score of 63 out of 100 based on 12 critics, indicating "generally favorable reviews".

References

External links

2017 American television series debuts
2018 American television series endings
American Broadcasting Company original programming
2010s American crime drama television series
Television shows set in Los Angeles
English-language television shows
Television series about missing people
Television series about television
Television series by Skydance Television
Television series by Uncharted